Labeobarbus macrophtalmus is a species of ray-finned fish in the genus Labeobarbus which is endemic to Lake Tana in Ethiopia where it is one of the rarer species of fish. It is threatened by overfishing, pollution, sedimentation and the introduction of invasive fish species.

References 

Endemic fauna of Ethiopia
macrophtalmus
Fish described in 1940
Fish of Lake Tana